Saint Polyeuctus (also Polyeuctes, Polyeuktos, Greek: Πολύευκτος) of Melitene (died 10 January 259) was an ancient Roman saint.  Christian tradition states that he was a wealthy Roman army officer who was the first martyr in Melitene, Armenia, under Valerian.

Symeon Metaphrastes writes that, moved by the zeal of his friend Saint Nearchus, Polyeuctus had openly converted to Christianity.  "Enflamed with zeal, St Polyeuctus went to the city square, and tore up the edict of Decius which required everyone to worship idols. A few moments later, he met a procession carrying twelve idols through the streets of the city. He dashed the idols to the ground and trampled them underfoot."

He was tortured by the authorities and ignored the tears and protestations of his wife Paulina, his children, and his father-in-law. He was beheaded.

Veneration

He was buried at Melitene, and a church was dedicated to him there.  Christian tradition states that the parents of Euthymius the Great prayed for a son at the church of St. Polyeuctus in Melitene.

A church was dedicated to him at Constantinople by Anicia Juliana in 524–527. The excavations undertaken in the 1960s revealed that, at the time of Justinian's ascension to the throne, the basilica was the largest in  Constantinople and that it featured some remarkably ostentatious display of wealth, such as gilded reliefs of peacocks, as well as much oriental detail.
 
His feast day was 7 January in the ancient Armenian calendars. His feast day is now 7 January in the Catholic calendar.  In the Eastern Orthodox liturgics, his feast falls on 9 January.  Polyektus is the patron saint of vows and treaty agreements.

Cultural references
Pierre Corneille, inspired by the account of Polyeuctus' martyrdom, used elements from the saint's story in his tragedy Polyeucte (1642).  In 1878 it was adapted into an opera by Charles Gounod, with the assistance of the librettist Jules Barbier.

Other works based on the play include a ballet by Marc-Antoine Charpentier (1679), and the opera Poliuto (1838) by Donizetti (adapted with Scribe as Les martyrs). Paul Dukas composed his Polyeucte overture, which premiered in January 1892.

References

External links
Catholic Online: Saint Polyeuctus

Saints from Roman Anatolia
Converts to Christianity from pagan religions
259 deaths
3rd-century Christian martyrs
Christian martyrs executed by decapitation
Place of birth unknown
Year of birth unknown
Attacks on religious buildings and structures
Military saints